Terence Riley may refer to:

Terence Riley (cricketer), English cricketer.
Terence Riley (curator), American architect and museum curator.